Pagonis is a surname and given name. Notable people with the name include: 

surname
Anastasia Pagonis (born 2004), American Paralympic swimmer
Kostas Pagonis (born 1985), Greek footballer
Nenad Pagonis (born 1987), Serbian kickboxer
Pidgeon Pagonis (born 1986), American intersex activist
William Pagonis (born 1941), American Army general

given name
Pagonis Vakalopoulos (born 1965), Greek footballer